The 1986 Pilot Pen Classic was a men's tennis tournament played on outdoor hard courts. It was the 13th edition of the Indian Wells Masters and was part of the 1986 Nabisco Grand Prix. It was played at the La Quinta Resort and Club in La Quinta, California in the United States from February 24 through March 3, 1986. Fifth-seeded Joakim Nyström won the singles title.

Finals

Singles

 Joakim Nyström defeated  Yannick Noah 6–1, 6–3, 6–2
 It was Nyström's 3rd title of the year and the 13th of his career.

Doubles

 Peter Fleming /  Guy Forget defeated  Yannick Noah /  Sherwood Stewart 6–4, 6–3
 It was Fleming's 1st title of the year and the 58th of his career. It was Forget's 1st title of the year and the 3rd of his career.

References

External links

 
 Association of Tennis Professionals (ATP) tournament profile

 
La Quinta, California
1986 Pilot Pen Classic
Pilot Pen Classic
Pilot Pen Classic
Pilot Pen Classic
Pilot Pen Classic
Pilot Pen Classic